The Australian Motorist Party (A.M.P.) was an Australian political party dedicated to representing motorist and road users, as well pedestrians, throughout Australia. It was founded by groups of concerned motorists.

Policies 
 Safety of drivers and pedestrians
 Issues involving young drivers such as education and training.
 Public transport
 Cost of driving
 Fuel taxes and alternative fuel sources

History 
The A.M.P. was formed in May 2007 and became an official registered party in 2008. They ran in each of the three electorate at the 2008 ACT elections and used a bus equipped with a public address system to promote their new political party. None of the candidates won the seats they were running for on election night, but Walford made a speech to A.M.P. president, Geoff Develin, to stay positive. In the 2012 ACT Elections the party ran candidates in each of the three electorates, most notably in Ginninderra, where Summernats organiser Chic Henry contested the seat and secured 6.6% of the vote. The party once again, however failed to have any candidates elected.

References

External links
 

2008 establishments in Australia
Political parties established in 2008
Defunct political parties in Australia
Recreational political parties
Automobile associations in Australia
Single-issue political parties in Australia